Nikhita Gandhi (born 1 October 1991) is an Indian playback singer who has worked in Indian films in four different languages. She has worked on Tamil, Hindi, Telugu, Bengali, and Kannada film projects.

She sang as the face of Deepika Padukone in Raabta for the title track "Raabta". Her song " Ullu ka Pattha" dual with Arijit Singh from the film Jagga Jasoos is a hit song. She sang for Sachin: A Billion Dreams, Chef, Jab Harry Met Sejal, and Ittefaq. She also sang a Bengali song "Mithe Alo" with Atif Aslam for Cockpit. Her song "Aao Kabhi Haveli Pe" and "Poster Lagwa Do" also became popular.

Personal life 
Nikhita is half-Bengali and half-Punjabi who has been in Chennai while doing her graduation. Growing up she learnt Odissi dance and Hindustani music for almost 12 years.

Career
Born into a mixed Bengali and Punjabi family in Kolkata. Nikhita has done her schooling from the prestigious La Martiniere for Girls, Kolkata. Nikhita relocated to Chennai in 2010 to pursue a degree in dentistry. A former student of A. R. Rahman's K. M. College of Music and Technology, Nikhita's first association with Rahman was during an Indo-German exchange, where she was a part of a choir which performed with the German orchestra. Rahman then individually auditioned her for a commercial project titled 'Qyuki' with Shekhar Kapur, the duo were working on. In 2012, she cut a Bengali album titled Kotha, a re-arrangement of Nazrul Geeti, songs written by renowned poet Kazi Nazrul Islam.

After having worked on her personal studio album and sung as a part of songs in regional films, Nikhita got a breakthrough by performing the song "Ladio" from Shankar's film, I (2015). Composed by A. R. Rahman, she managed to record the song within four hours after translating it into Hindi. She then also subsequently recorded the Telugu and Hindi versions of the song, earning critical acclaim for her work. Other projects she worked for in 2015 include Rahman's O Kadhal Kanmani and Anirudh's Thanga Magan.

Apart from singing in the movies, she has put together a band and has also performed at Kerala and Kolkata. Gandhi's five-member band includes Sajith Sathya, Jerard Felix, Godfrey Immanuel and Joshua Gopal.

She has been adjudged as the best female playback singer of the year by Zee Cine Awards 2018 for the title track of Raabta.

She was nominated for best playback singer (female) category in the 63rd Filmfare Awards for her song "Ghar" from Jab Harry Met Sejal.

She was also nominated for best playback singer (female) in the 3rd Filmfare Awards East for her Bengali song "Tomra Ekhono Ki" from Meghnad Badh Rahasya.

In November 2018 she did playback for the hit song Qaafirana from the film Kedarnath. In April 2019, she won the Nestle Kitkat Sony Mix Audience Music Award for the best duet for Qaafirana from Kedarnath along with Arijit Singh.

In April 2019, she released her single Ek Do Teen on Zee Music Company that has been composed by Raees & Zain - Sam, she later followed it up with Madari from the film The Extraordinary Journey of The Fakir along with Vishal Dadlani in June 2019 and followed it up with Main Deewana Tera from Arjun Patiala

Discography

Accolades

References

Living people
Indian women playback singers
Singers from Kolkata
Telugu playback singers
Tamil playback singers
Kannada playback singers
Bollywood playback singers
1991 births
Women musicians from West Bengal
Zee Cine Awards winners
21st-century Indian women singers
21st-century Indian singers